Queens County or Queen's County may refer to:

Canada
Queens County, New Brunswick
Queens County, Nova Scotia
Queens County, Prince Edward Island
 Former Queen's County (electoral district)

Ireland
Queen's County, former name of County Laois

United States
Queens County, New York, coterminous with the New York borough of Queens

See also 
 Queens (disambiguation) for other things named "Queens" or "Queen's"